Korochi is a census town near Ichalkaranji in Kolhapur district Maharashtra.

Demographics
 India census, Korochi had a population of 28,136. Males constitute 53% of the population and females 47%. Korochi has an average literacy rate of 69%, higher than the national average of 59.5%: male literacy is 76%, and female literacy is 60%. In Korochi, 14% of the population is under 6 years of age.

Education
The most popular Marathi or English medium school in Korochi is Ratna Deep High school & jr. college kabnur 
The town boasts of few Marathi Medium schools and one English Medium CBSE School called New Generation Innovative School, which also follows the Day Boarding pattern, by Mrs. Vijaya Mohan.

References

Speciality
Most of the people here depends on 'Construction Worker' as it has more population are illiterates. And also depend on, 'Powerloom' is nearer to the Manchester city Ichalkaranji.

It has transformed from village to suburb of Ichalkaranji City. Ichalkaranji City Border is just 1-2 km from Korochi. It has co-operative banks branch, Insurance Office, Post Office, Schools, Colleges and all necessary infrastructure to boast as suburb of Ichalkaranji. It is developing fast and will be part of Ichalkaranji City in much time

Major Areas
1. Sanyukta Colony
2. Lokmanya Nagar
3. Korochi Gaobhag
4. Bhairavnath Shikshan Samuh Korochi ( BSS)
4. Chavare Mala
5. Dhangar Mal
6. Vivekanand Nagar
7. Chavanwadi
8. shivnager
9. Sai Colony
10. Siddarth Nagar
11. Pawale mala
12. Shivaji nagar
13. Kolsa karkhana
14. Ratnparvati Vasahat

Edited By Rajkumar Jaypal Magdum

Cities and towns in Kolhapur district